Prelude in C (Bach) can refer to one of several compositions by Johann Sebastian Bach:

 Prelude in C major, BWV 846, from the Prelude and Fugue in C major, BWV 846, from Book I of The Well-Tempered Clavier
 Ave Maria (Bach/Gounod) a popular setting of the Latin text Ave Maria, composed by Charles Gounod to be superimposed over Bach's Prelude in C major, BWV 846
 Prelude in C minor, BWV 847, from the Prelude and Fugue in C minor, BWV 847, from Book I of The Well-Tempered Clavier
 Prelude in C minor, BWV 871, from the Prelude and Fugue in C minor, BWV 871, from Book II of The Well-Tempered Clavier
 Prelude in C minor, BWV 934, from the Six Little Preludes, BWV 933–938
 Prelude in C minor, BWV 999, for solo lute

See also 
 Prelude in C (disambiguation)